James Martin Ayres (born 18 September 1980) is an English former footballer who played as a central defender. He played in the Football League for Luton Town and in non-League football for Stevenage Borough, Dagenham & Redbridge, Kettering Town, Hitchin Town and Braintree Town.

References

External links

James Ayres profile at Aylesbury United

1980 births
Living people
English footballers
Footballers from Luton
Luton Town F.C. players
Stevenage F.C. players
Dagenham & Redbridge F.C. players
Kettering Town F.C. players
Enfield F.C. players
Hitchin Town F.C. players
Braintree Town F.C. players
National League (English football) players
Isthmian League players
Association football central defenders